Yuriy Vitaliyovych Odarchenko (born 5 April 1960) is a Ukrainian politician, member of the Batkivshchyna All-Ukrainian Union "Fatherland" party. 2006–2014 he was a member of Ukrainian parliament. On 2 March 2014 Odarchenko was appointed the governor of Kherson Oblast.

Biography
In the 2006 and 2007 Ukrainian parliamentary election Odarchenko was elected to parliament as a candidate of Yulia Tymoshenko Bloc. In the 2012 Ukrainian parliamentary election he was reelected to parliament for Batkivshchyna All-Ukrainian Union "Fatherland" party.

On 2 March 2014 Odarchenko was appointed the governor of Kherson Oblast. Odarchenko's gubernal 2014 9 May Victory Day speech caused controversy in its crowd.

During the 2014 Ukrainian parliamentary election Odarchenko lost in constituency 182 to Oleksandr Spivakovskyy with a minimal difference.

On 27 August 2014 he resigned his position as governor due to disagreements with the new President of Ukraine Petro Poroshenko.

During 17 July 2016 constituency mid-term elections Odarchenko was elected back into the Ukrainian parliament for Batkivshchyna (in constituency 183).

In the 2019 Ukrainian parliamentary election Odarchenko failed to get elected back into the Ukrainian parliament for Batkivshchyna after losing in constituency 182 finishing fourth with 7.32% of the votes.

Notes

References

External link 

1960 births
All-Ukrainian Union "Fatherland" politicians
Living people
Fifth convocation members of the Verkhovna Rada
Sixth convocation members of the Verkhovna Rada
Seventh convocation members of the Verkhovna Rada
Eighth convocation members of the Verkhovna Rada
Politicians from Kherson
People of the Euromaidan
20th-century Ukrainian economists
People of the annexation of Crimea by the Russian Federation
Governors of Kherson Oblast